Victor Rodrigues Penalber de Oliveira (born 22 May 1990) is a Brazilian judoka.

Career

Penalber started to practice judo at the age of four. He studied and trained at Universidade Gama Filho and today trains at the Instituto Reação, created by the ex-judoka Flávio Canto. He is left handed and his preferred technique is seoi-nage.

His first success was the gold medal at the 2008 Pan American Judo Championships at the 73 kg class; he won again in 2013 in the 81 kg class. At the 2008 World Judo Teams Championship in Tokyo he tested positively for furosemide and was suspended for two years.

Penalber competed at the 2013 World Judo Championships held in his home town, and lost his third bout to the eventual gold medalist Loïc Pietri. He won bronze medals at the 2015 World Judo Championships and 2015 Pan American Games.

Penalber competed at the 2016 Summer Olympics in the men's 81 kg event, in which he was eliminated in the third round by Sergiu Toma.

Personal life

Wrestler Giullia Penalber is his sister. She also competed in judo before switching to freestyle wrestling.

References

External links

 
 

Brazilian male judoka
1990 births
Sportspeople from Rio de Janeiro (city)
Judoka at the 2015 Pan American Games
Pan American Games bronze medalists for Brazil
Living people
Judoka at the 2016 Summer Olympics
Olympic judoka of Brazil
Pan American Games medalists in judo
Universiade bronze medalists for Brazil
Universiade medalists in judo
Medalists at the 2011 Summer Universiade
Medalists at the 2015 Pan American Games
21st-century Brazilian people